The Global Esports Federation (GEF) is a non-governmental organization that convenes the world's esports (or competitive video gaming) community. It was established on December 16, 2019, and is headquartered in Singapore, where it is a registered society under the Singapore Registry of Societies.

The GEF is a convening body for the esports ecosystem. The mission of GEF is to "cultivate competition along with developing communities and the connection between sport, esports, and technology". The organization set up the GEF Events Properties, consisting of the Global Esports Games, Global Esports Tour, and a community initiative series. It also runs GEFcon — Global Esports Federation Convention — a thought leadership and ideation incubator platform, and GEFestival, an event around esports culture, art, music, fashion, entertainment, and youth.

According to its constitution, Member Federations from around the world can be a part of the GEF. As of January 2023, there are 16 Commissions and two Councils that guide the work of the GEF. The first and current President of the GEF is Chris Chan of Singapore.

History 
The GEF was launched on 16 December 2019 with Chris Chan appointed as its first President. The Board currently consists of a President, six vice-presidents, and 14 board members. The GEF appointed its first Chief Executive Officer, Paul J. Foster, in March 2021.

The GEF has a diverse Global Events Portfolio. Its Global Esports Games (GEG) staged its inaugural edition in 2021 and will take place annually. The first GEG was held in Singapore in December 2021, followed by the second edition in Istanbul, Turkey in 2022 and Riyadh, Saudi Arabia in 2023.

GEF Board

GEF Commissions

Member Federations 

As of January 2023, there are more than 150 global partnerships, including over 127 Member Federations in the GEF.

Development Federations 
In September 2021, the GEF announced the creation of two Esports Development Federations: the Africa Esports Development Federation and the Pan Am Esports Development Federation. It was unveiled as part of the GEF's commitment to developing the esports ecosystem around the world.

Events

Global Esports Games 
The Global Esports Games (GEG) is an event of the GEF. It is a multi-title esports competition featuring athletes from Member Federations and takes place in December every year.

In May 2021, the GEF announced the host cities for the first three editions of the GEG. The inaugural GEG took place in Singapore in 2021, followed by Istanbul in 2022 and will head to Riyadh in 2023.

Three esports titles were contested at Singapore 2021 Global Esports Games: Valve’s Dota 2 (PC Multiplayer Online Battle Arena), Konami’s eFootball PES 2021 Season Update, and Capcom’s Street Fighter V. Active Esports was included as a demonstration event, featuring FreeStriker, a non-contact virtual sport that pits martial arts athletes against each other using real-time motion tracking.

Istanbul 2022 Global Esports Games featured Valve’s Dota 2 (PC Multiplayer Online Battle Arena), Konami’s eFootball 2023, Capcom’s Street Fighter V, and Krafton's PUBG Mobile.

Editions

Global Esports Tour 
The Global Esports Tour (GET) is a series of tournaments for professional esports athletes and teams.

In September 2021, the GEF announced the first series of the GET, with each stage showcasing a different esports title.

 Los Angeles, United States of America: September 27–28 - Hearthstone
 Riyadh, Saudi Arabia: October 21–23 - PUBG Mobile
 Dubai, United Arab Emirates: November 26–27 - Counter-strike: Global Offensive

The first edition of the GET had a total prize pool of US$500,000.

Partners 
Tencent is a Founding Global Partner of the GEF. The federation also has a list of other partners, including Strategic Partners Commonwealth Games Federation, FACEIT, International Telecommunication Union, Peace and Sport and UNESCO.

External links 

 Global Esports Federation
 Singapore 2021 Global Esports Games
 Istanbul 2022 Global Esports Games

References 

Esports governing bodies
2019 establishments in Singapore
Organizations established in 2019
Organisations based in Singapore
International organisations based in Singapore